Rajapolah is a district in Tasikmalaya Regency in the Province of West Java, Indonesia. The district is well known for its handicrafts. Rajapolah is one of the most important districts in Tasikmalaya Regency, both economically and culturally.

Geography 
Rajapolah is situated in the middle of the drainage basin of northwestern Tasikmalaya Regency. The district lies in a relatively low-laying ground at average height of 450 m and surrounded by Galunggung highlands to the west and Sawal highlands to the east. The land of the district is mainly a gently inclined area as it slopes down from the west towards the east exit channel of the basin of the Citanduy River.

Located 17 km northeast of Tasikmalaya Regency's capital Singaparna, the district comprises an area of 16.9204 km2, consists of 6.5917 km2 of dryland and 10.3287 km2 of wetland. It borders with Jamanis District to the north, and borders with Ciamis Regency to the east as it lined with Citanduy River. On the south, Rajapolah is bounded by Cisayong District, and on the west is bounded by Sukahening District.

Governance 
The district of Rajapolah is divided into 8 villages.
 Manggungjaya
 Tanjungpura
 Sukaraja
 Rajapolah
 Dawagung
 Manggungsari
 Rajamandala
 Sukanagalih

Culture 

Rajapolah people, estimated population of 37,558, are noted for their traditional works, the handicrafts. They produced a wide range area of crafts, from decorative items such as wall hangings, rugs, jewelry boxes, picture frames, to functional goods, like baskets, bags, mats, racks, plates, sandals, and cushions. Their products are exported worldwide, mainly to the U.S., Europe, and some of Asia regions. Most of the artisans created their works traditionally with their hands through weaving, plaiting, and coiling, and commonly using simple and traditional equipment. Their creations are mainly made from natural materials, such as wood, bamboo, reed, cane (rattan), rush, water hyacinth, sisal fibre, ash-wood splints, jute cord, absorbent paper, pandan, mendong (straw), and other natural materials.

Notes and references 

Tasikmalaya Regency